The Rahman Baba High School is a High-school  located in western Kabul, Afghanistan. It was originally built in the 1950s, but saw large-scale destruction during the Soviet–Afghan War and ongoing Afghanistan conflict. Following the United States invasion of Afghanistan, the school underwent a massive reconstruction campaign as part of a joint German, Japanese and Pakistani effort. Following its rebuilding, the school has been among the highest-ranking educational institutions in Kabul Province. It is specially dedicated to meet the needs of students living in the rural areas of Afghanistan, and follows the curriculum of the Afghanistan Ministry of Education in the Pashto language. 

The school has a specialized English program, where over 700 students from predominantly ethnic Pashtun areas are developing English skills through programs conducted by the Rauf Learning Center.

See also
List of schools in Kabul

References

Schools in Kabul
Educational institutions established in the 1950s
1950s establishments in Afghanistan